Sompting Abbotts Preparatory School is a historic West Sussex independent school in Sompting, near Worthing and Steyning. It educates children of both sexes aged 2 to 13. The school sits in parkland of 30 acres, which includes woodland, chalk grassland slopes and a pond.

The school was founded in 1921 and is a member of the Independent Association of Preparatory Schools (IAPS) and it is a non-selective day school. The headmaster is Stuart Douch and the principal is Patricia Sinclair. The school has strong links with the Church of St Mary the Blessed Virgin and holds its annual Harvest Festival and Christmas carol services there.

Sompting Abbotts House 

The main school is housed in Sompting Abbotts House which was originally called Sompting Manor.
Sompting Abbotts and the estate around it is believed to have been inhabited since the Neolithic period. The line of the original Chichester–Brighton Roman road runs through the school parkland.

Following the dissolution of the monasteries by Henry VIII, Sompting Manor was granted in 1540 to Thomas Howard, Duke of Norfolk.

In 1814, Princess Caroline, wife of the Prince of Wales (later King George IV), stayed at the manor on one of her royal visits to Worthing. It followed a stay in the town during her troubled marriage.
The next day, she sailed to France from Lancing.

The manor, along with its  estate passed to Reverend P.G. Croft in 1830. At this time, the manor contained a house with a five-bay symmetrical south front.

Sompting Abbotts House was built in 1856 for Rev. Croft's son, Henry. it was designed by the architect Philip Charles Hardwick (later to design the great hall of Euston railway station) in Neo-Gothic style for the then owner Henry Croft to replace Sompting Manor. Hardwick's design was completed in 1856. The 1875 Ordnance Survey map shows the ground to the east and south with sweeping lawns and groups of trees which remain today. Sompting Abbotts House features high slate roofs, lancet casement windows, stone mullions, octagonal towers, spiral staircases and a castellated parapet. The house is a Grade II listed building.

School history 
The school was founded following World War I by the Rutherford family in 1921.  Mr. A.C. Rutherford opened Sompting Abbotts House as a boys' boarding school in 1921, which lasted until the outbreak of World War II in 1939, when it was temporary closed. The school was evacuated to Cabalva Hall, Wales, and the Army took control of the house and grounds.

The Sinclair family acquired the premises in 1946, following the war, and reopened it as a boy's boarding school, though it had become dilapidated in the interim. The headmaster, Nigel Sinclair, later wrote "It was a depressing sight. All the playing fields and lawns were an unrecognisable overgrown jungle of grass and bushes," adding that most windows had been broken." In 2018, a wartime letter to a past pupil, dated 1939, was discovered under the floorboards of a dormitory. The school traced its original owner to Australia.
Over the years, the school has evolved. It became co-educational in 1998 and closed its boarding facilities in 2008. In total, it has had six headmasters: John Hammond, George Rutherford, Nigel Sinclair, Richard Johnson and Timothy Sinclair. The current head is Stuart Douch.

Curriculum 

The school offers a curriculum that includes IT, coding and computing, art, PE, music and drama. It prepares children for the Common Entrance Examination (CEE) and other scholarship examinations to public senior schools. As of 2017 it cites a 100% success rate in the CEE since 2008 and 95% success rate for all pupils entered for a scholarship since 2008. The school is not a designated feeder school to any specific senior school. Destination senior schools to which pupils have gained scholarships, exhibitions and awards since 2007 include Lancing College, Brighton College, Hurstpierpoint College, Seaford College, Sherborne, Worth, Dulwich College, Farlington, Burgess Hill Girls and Towers Convent School.

Notable alumni 
The author Alex Preston described Sompting Abbotts as "all of my Jennings and Malory Towers fantasies rolled into one Gothic dream of a building." Other alumni include lead singers Samuel Preston (of The Ordinary Boys) and Ned Mortimer (of August and After), property developer Nicholas Sutton, cricketer and headmaster Chris Saunders, and Simon Walsh, consultant in emergency medicine at The Royal London Hospital. Nicholas Linfield, appointed an OBE for services to defence in the 2017 New Year Honours, said: "There are legions of us out there who owe this school an enormous debt of gratitude."

External links
 School website

References 

Preparatory schools in West Sussex
Educational institutions established in 1921
1921 establishments in England